Claire Ahuriri-Dunning (born 1989) is a New Zealand playwright.

Personal life 
Ahuriri-Dunning was born in Takapuna, Auckland, in 1989. She has Ngāti Porou, Ngāti Kahungunu, Scots, German Jewish and Irish Catholic heritage. She was educated at Glenfield College, and then earned a Bachelor of Arts degree at the University of Auckland. She has worked as a software tester and a drama teacher at a high school. With her husband James Dunning, Ahuriri-Dunning is the founder of Pearangi Creative and Sky Bear Games.

Plays 
 Spilt Milk, a classroom play, published in "Stage Adventures: Eight Classroom Plays".
 A Midsummer's Nightmare, a short version of Shakespeare's A Midsummer Nights Dream, designed for teens.
 Alice's Revenge, in which an actress is murdered during casting for the role of Alice in Alice in Wonderland.
 Dracula
 Hercules, a 30 minutes interactive play for young children
 King Arthur the Pantomime.
 Shakespeare Junior, in which Shakespeare enters a playwriting competition.
 The Iliad, with James Dunning, with Homer's story in a World War I setting. Dunning-Ahuriri wrote, produced and directed the Iliad at the Pumphouse Theatre in Auckland in April 2018.

Other work 
In 2009, Ahuriri-Dunning wrote and directed The Virgin Party at the Drama Studio at the University of Auckland. Reviewer James Amos described it as "a fairly judicious (yet fun and very thought provoking) look at women's roles and stereotypes throughout history".

Ahuriri-Dunning has also published a board game, Cat Capers.

Awards 
Spilt Milk won Auckland Flip the Script in 2005, and later also received a Special Mention from Playmarket's Plays for the Young competition in 2010. Dracula was shortlisted in the Adam NZ Play Awards of 2018.

References 

New Zealand dramatists and playwrights
Ngāti Porou people
Ngāti Kahungunu people
1989 births
Living people
University of Auckland alumni
Writers from Auckland
New Zealand Māori writers
People educated at Glenfield College
People from Takapuna